Firebreather is an American computer-animated superhero television film, based on the Image Comics comic book series of the same name, which premiered on November 24, 2010, on Cartoon Network. It was directed by Peter Chung from a screenplay by James Krieg based on a story of Phil Hester and Andy Kuhn, and stars the voices of Jesse Head, Dana Delany, Kevin Michael Richardson, Reed Diamond, Dante Basco, Tia Texada, and Amy Davidson.

Plot
On the last day of the war between humans and Kaiju, a human woman named Margaret Rosenblatt (voiced by Dana Delany) and a male dragon Kaiju named Belloc, the King of the Kaiju, (voiced by Kevin Michael Richardson) fall in love, and become parents to a human/Kaiju hybrid son named Duncan.

Sixteen years later, Margaret and Duncan (voiced by Jesse Head) are moving into a new house as he gets ready for his first day at a new school. However, Duncan fears that his orange skin and appetite for coal will make others think of him as a freak and a prime target for bullies. At school, he quickly develops a crush on its popular girl Jenna (voiced by Amy Davidson) and makes an enemy out of her ex-boyfriend Troy Adams (voiced by Josh Keaton). In biology class, Duncan makes friends with fellow outcasts Kenny and Isabel (voiced by Dante Basco and Tia Texada), the latter who happens to be a Kaiju-obsessed fangirl who develops a crush on Duncan after he shows her a Gomorradon, a small frog-like Kaiju he caught under cover of apparently making a fool of himself.

Late that evening, Troy's friends break into Jenna's locker and steal the money she was holding for the school's Homecoming. The next day, Duncan meets up with "Blitz" Barnes (voiced by Reed Diamond), a M.E.G.T.A.F. agent undercover as the gym teacher, and defends Kenny from Troy and his friends in a game of dodge ball. After a confrontation between Duncan and Troy, Blitz takes Duncan to Dr. Pytel (voiced by Nicole Sullivan) at the M.E.G.T.A.F. base upon the discovery of his ability to breathe fire. Later back at school, Blitz smooths things over with Principal Dave (voiced by Gary Anthony Williams) to keep Duncan out of trouble. While he and Troy are cleaning up their mess in the cafeteria, Isabel tells Duncan about a party that everybody will be going to and he agrees to go in hopes of impressing Jenna.

At the party, Troy tries to tell Jenna about Duncan until Troy's father (voiced by Gary Anthony Williams) comes and drags him back home for being out while grounded. Duncan and Jenna begin to form a friendship but she abruptly leaves after he talks about Troy's father. Isabel finds him and tells him that Jenna walked off because she had lost her own father. However, things take a turn for the worse as Belloc arrives looking for Duncan. While hiding with Isabel, Duncan reveals to her that Belloc is his father. Belloc finds them and Duncan tells Isabel to run, but before she can escape, Belloc traps her underneath his tail. Duncan demands him to let her go and lures him away, freeing Isabel. King Belloc chases Duncan but quickly captures him and takes him away to the Kaiju lair in the desert. Much to Duncan's dismay, he learns that King Belloc wants him to become his successor as "King of the Kaiju" and rule over the giant dragon-like monsters, though King Belloc believes that the human world has made Duncan soft when he needs to be remorseless. Then King Belloc presents Duncan as his heir to the other Kaiju and throws him into a lava pit; Duncan emerges in his Kaiju form and faints from the transition.

Waking in the desert, he finds his way to Kenny's trailer. Kenny tells Duncan that Isabel told him about Belloc being his father and asks why he was at the party. Duncan replies that Isabel invited him, causing Kenny to become jealous. Back home with his mother, she assures him that the move and deal with M.E.G.T.A.F. were to let him live a normal life and eventually go to college.

Back in school, Duncan is surprised that everyone except Troy now treats him like a celebrity. Isabel reveals that it is because she told them about him "saving" them from Belloc. Then Duncan sees Jenna head for the locker room and leaves. Meanwhile, Jenna opens her locker to find an envelope (left by Duncan) with a red crystal inside to sell and pay for Homecoming.

Later, Isabel attempts to approach Duncan but loses her chance when he and Jenna meet up again. He asks Jenna to be his date for Homecoming, and she agrees. Afterwards, Blitz takes Duncan into the desert planning to use him to locate the Kaiju lair, but they fall under attack. Duncan fights the Kaiju while his father watches, as it is the first of many challenges for the Kaiju throne. Duncan almost kills the Kaiju but refuses to do so. Then Blitz appears with reinforcements and they open fire on Belloc until he abruptly surrenders.

That night, Duncan, Jenna, Kenny, Isabel, and Margaret (as one of the chaperones) go to the dance together. As Jenna and Duncan dance together, Isabel watches them despite Kenny's attempts to get her to dance with him. However, after Troy and Jenna are elected Homecoming King and Queen and go on stage, Isabel dances with Duncan in a romantic embrace, causing Kenny to break them apart and unleash his jealous fury. In the process, Kenny yells at Duncan that Isabel only likes him because of Belloc being his father. Jenna overhears this and backs away from Duncan into Troy's arms, causing Duncan to storm out. As Isabel reprimands Kenny for what he did, two Kaiju named Abbadon and Astaroth appear.

Just as Abbadon and Astaroth start wreaking havoc, putting all the dance participants in danger, a fully Kaiju-empowered Duncan comes to their aid. Changing to his Kaiju form, he fights off the two kaiju while his friends get out of danger. Then he draws them out to the town and into the desert. Meanwhile, Margaret and Jenna head off in a plane to get King Belloc's help. King Belloc breaks out and hurries to help Duncan. Duncan climbs a cliff only to have Blitz be there and start pounding on him. Then Abbadon and Astaroth reach them and try to eat Blitz; Duncan jumps off the cliff to catch him. As they fall, Duncan gets a new ability: wings, and gets Blitz to a safe place. Then he turns his attention to fighting. During the battle, Duncan gets trapped and Margaret and Jenna arrive, crashing their jet into the kaiju after ejecting themselves. King Belloc arrives and then Duncan and Belloc fight together. Duncan, refusing to kill them, causes an avalanche to fall, freezing the two Kaiju solid but sparing the pyrokinetic Duncan and his father.

King Belloc allows himself to be recaptured and carried away in order to be closer to Duncan, Jenna (who had earlier realized that it was Duncan who had left the red gem) apologizes to Duncan for her earlier behavior, and Duncan flies off with his new wings.

Cast
 Jesse Head as Duncan Rosenblatt
 Dana Delany as Margaret Rosenblatt
 Kevin Michael Richardson as Belloc
 Reed Diamond as Agent "Blitz" Barnes
 Amy Davidson as Jenna Shwartzendruber
 Tia Texada as Isabel Vasques
 Dante Basco as Kenny Rogers
 Josh Keaton as Troy Adams
 Grey DeLisle as Ms. Julia Dreakford
 Billy Evans as Steve
 Jameson Moss as Big Rob
 Nicole Sullivan as Dr. Alexandrine Pytel
 Tom Tartamella as Whitey
 Gary Anthony Williams as Principal Dave and Troy's Dad

Reception
Mania.com's Rob Worley viewed Firebreather at the New York Comic Con, awarding the film a B+ and stating "Teen Angst + Kaiju Big Battle = CG Awesome!," but criticizing how the animation could be "... somewhat distracting as the characters sometimes have a puppet-like appearance." Worley concluded that he would like to see the film turned into a franchise or a TV series.

R.L. Shaffer of IGN rated the film 6/10, saying that it was "hardly impressive on any level", but "enjoyable", and that it would appeal to younger audiences. Brian Lowry of Variety called the film "generally a bore between battles", calling the monsters "a sight to behold", but wishing the protagonist spent "less time in school". David Hinckley of the New York Daily News stated that "in general, it succeeds", calling its romance elements "chaste" and "just to make things interesting for someone other than 10-year-old boys".

Home media
The film was released on DVD and Blu-ray on March 22, 2011. Bonus features include a 2-D animation test, deleted scenes, animatics, and a visual development featurette.

References
Notes

External links

 

Cartoon Network Studios animated films
Cartoon Network original programming
Films based on Image Comics
2010 action films
2010s adventure films
American children's animated adventure films
American children's animated superhero films
American computer-animated films
Animated films about dragons
Giant monster films
Kaiju films
2010s American animated films
Animated films based on comics
2010s animated superhero television films
2010 films
Films directed by Peter Chung
Films scored by Toby Chu
2010s English-language films
2010s Japanese films